Samantha Joanne Payne MBE is the co-founder of Open Bionics, a bionics company developing affordable prosthetics for children.

Payne has won a number of international awards for her work including the MIT Technology Review 'Innovators under 35' in 2018, James Dyson gong for innovative engineering and Wired Innovation Fellow in 2016. In the Queen's Birthday Honours list 2020, Payne was awarded an MBE, for her work making bionic technology more accessible.

Career 
Born and raised in Knowle West, Payne is a graduate of Whitworth University and has a Bachelor of Arts/Science.

She worked as a journalist, specialising in technology before becoming a co-founder of Open Bionics. In 2013, whilst working as a journalist, Payne interviewed Joel Gibbard, who was a robotics graduate at the time. Gibbard and Payne later became business partners and co-founders of Open Bionics.

Payne and Gibbard founded Open Bionics in 2014. The start-up is based at the Technology Business Incubator at Bristol Robotics Laboratory. The aim of the company was to develop "affordable, assistive devices that enhance the human body."

Open Bionics has partnered with Disney to make prosthetics based on Disney characters for children.

Her work at Open Bionics has been featured in The Guardian  and Daily Mirror.

Innovation 
Open Bionics uses 3D scanning to take the initial prosthetic fitting and 3D printing to improve the prosthetic design. These innovations significantly reduce the build-time and the material costs for a personalised hand, making prosthetics more affordable for amputees. Payne estimates that, if bought from private providers, bionic hands with multi-grip functionality cost up to £60,000, compared to £5,000 from Open Bionics.

Awards and recognition 
In 2015, Payne was shortlisted for Women in Business 'Young Entrepreneur of The Year' award. In 2018, Payne featured on the Forbes 30 Under 30 list in the Sciences and Healthcare category.

References 

British women engineers
Members of the Order of the British Empire
Year of birth missing (living people)
Living people
British women in business
Bionics
Prosthetics
Whitworth University alumni

Women bioengineers
People from Bristol